Chief Commissioner's Province refers to middle-level and minor type of provinces of India and in the post-colonial successor states, not headed by a (lieutenant-)governor but by a Chief commissioner, notably :

 in present India :
 Chief Commissioner's Province of Ajmer-Merwara (the British Political Agent in Rajputana served as ex officio Chief Commissioner)
 Chief Commissioner's Province of Delhi
 Chief Commissioner's Province of Andaman and Nicobar Islands
 Chief Commissioner's Province of Assam
 Central Provinces and Berar
 Chief Commissioner's Province of Coorg (the British Resident in Mysore served as ex officio Chief Commissioner)
 Chief Commissioner's Province of Himachal Pradesh
 in present Pakistan :
 North-West Frontier Province
 Chief Commissioner's Province of Balochistan (the British Political Agent in Baluchistan served as ex officio Chief Commissioner)

Chief commissioner's province refers to a province that was not under the direct control of a Lieutenant Governor.

During cabinate mission plan 4 members for constituent assembly were to be sent from chief commissioners province .

Former subdivisions of India
Former subdivisions of Pakistan